Larinskaya is a rural locality (a village) in Nyuksenskoye Rural Settlement, Nyuksensky District, Vologda Oblast, Russia. The population was 37 as of 2002.

Geography 
Larinskaya is located 20 km southeast of Nyuksenitsa (the district's administrative centre) by road. Sovetsky is the nearest rural locality.

References 

Rural localities in Nyuksensky District